l'île du Gouvernement is an island in the St. Brandon archipelago. The island is uninhabited, and mostly functions as a bird and turtle sanctuary.

References 

Islands of St. Brandon
Mascarene Islands
Outer Islands of Mauritius
Reefs of the Indian Ocean
Fishing areas of the Indian Ocean
Insular ecology
Important Bird Areas of Mauritius
Flora of Mauritius
Atolls of the Indian Ocean
Biodiversity
Conchology